The Rock: Pressure Makes Diamonds is the sixth studio album by American rapper San Quinn.  The single "Hell Yeah!" featuring Allen Anthony and E-A-Ski received considerable radio play, and a video was also shot for the song. The song peaked at #19 on the Bubbling Under R&B/Hip-Hop Songs chart, making it both artists' only charting and most successful single to date. The album debuted at #100 on the R&B/Hip-Hop Albums chart, #20 on the Independent Albums chart, and #12 on the Heatseekers Albums chart.

Track listing

References

2006 albums
Albums produced by Cozmo
Albums produced by Maxwell Smart (record producer)
San Quinn albums
SMC Recordings albums